Buzyurovo (Bozor; , Bocır) is a rural locality (a selo) and the administrative centre of Buzyurovsky Selsoviet, Bakalinsky District, Bashkortostan, Russia. The population was 486 as of 2010. There are 6 streets.

Geography 
Buzyurovo is located 24 km southwest of Bakaly (the district's administrative centre) by road. Alexandrovka is the nearest rural locality.

References 

Rural localities in Bakalinsky District